The men's 500 metre at the 2011 World Short Track Speed Skating Championships took place 12 March at the Sheffield Arena.

Results

Preliminaries
Top two athletes from each heat and the next two fastest thirds qualified for heats.

Heat 1

Heat 3

Heat 5

Heat 7

Heat 9

Heat 11

Heat 13

Heat 2

Heat 4

Heat 6

Heat 8

Heat 10

Heat 12

Heats
Top 2 Athletes from each heat and the next 2 fastest thirds qualified for quarterfinals.

Heat 1

Heat 3

Heat 5

Heat 7

Heat 2

Heat 4

Heat 6

Quarterfinals
Top 2 Athletes from each heat qualified for Semifinals.

Heat 1

Heat 3

Heat 2

Heat 4

Semifinals
Top 2 Athletes from each heat qualified for the Final.

Heat 1

Heat 2

Final

References

2011 World Short Track Speed Skating Championships